Dosseh Gagnon Attivi (born 7 February 1989) is a Togolese footballer who plays as a defender.

Career
Attivi started his career in the Thai Premier League with Sisaket in 2010. He then moved to fellow Thai club, Air Force United till 2012.

Attivi then moved to India where he signed for newly promoted I-League club United Sikkim. He made his debut for the Indian side on 28 October 2012 against Dempo. He came on as a 54th-minute substitute for Sonam Bhutia as United Sikkim lost 1–2. He then scored his one and only goal for the club on 24 November 2012 against Pune. His 25th-minute strike was not good enough however as the match ended in a 2–2 draw. He was eventually released however by United Sikkim in 2013.

References

1989 births
Living people
Togolese footballers
Dosseh Attivi
United Sikkim F.C. players
Association football defenders
I-League players
Expatriate footballers in Thailand
Expatriate footballers in India
21st-century Togolese people
People from Atakpamé